Randers Tropical Zoo is an indoor zoo in Randers, Denmark. It is located in three big domes, with the biomes of Africa, Asia, and South America. The domes contain animals from the biomes, and most of the animals live freely in the domes. In addition there are many reptiles, a snakeyard with free harmless snakes, and a saltwater aquarium with tropical fish.

The zoo first opened with two domes (Africa and Asia); the third being built later. In total there are approximately 275 animal species in Randers Tropical Zoo; about 200 in the domes and 75 in the saltwater aquarium. In 2015, an exhibit for jaguars opened, which is the first located outside the domes. Adjacent to the domes is Danmarksparken ("Denmark Park") with farm animals and playgrounds.

The climate inside the domes is controlled by computers because the length of daylight hours varies much more in Denmark than in tropical latitudes.

Notes

External links

Zoos in Denmark
Tropical Zoo
Indoor zoos
Buildings and structures in the Central Denmark Region
Tourist attractions in the Central Denmark Region
Zoos established in 1996